The University of Nantes is a public university located in the city of Nantes, France. In addition to the several campuses scattered in the city of Nantes, there are two satellite campuses located in Saint-Nazaire and La Roche-sur-Yon. The university ranked between 401-500th in the Times Higher Education of 2016.

On a national scale and regarding the professional insertion after graduation, the University of Nantes oscillates between 3rd and 40th out of 69 universities depending on the field of studies. Currently, the university is attended by approximately 34,500 students. More than 10% of them are international students coming from 110 countries.

Notable alumni include former Prime Minister Jean-Marc Ayrault, former Minister of Agriculture Stéphane Le Foll, and United Nations official Clément Nyaletsossi Voule.

History
The current University was founded in 1970 under the terms of the 1968 law which reformed French higher education.  This newly established institution replaced the former University of Nantes which had been founded in the early 1960s.  This itself was a re-establishment of the original University of Nantes which was established by papal bull in 1460 but was abolished during the French Revolution.

Medieval University 
The university of Brittany is found by Bertrand Milon on April 4, 1460, at the initiative of the duke François II of Brittany under the form of a papal bull of the Pope Pie II given to Sienne. This embodies the wish of François II to affirm his independence towards the French king, while near the duchy in Angers in 1432, Poitier in 1432 and Bordeaux in 1441, some universities are created. Found under the structure of a studium generale, this university can teach all traditional disciplines: Arts, Theology, Law and Medecin. The number of students between the end of the 15th century and during the two following centuries reach a thousand or 1500, according to the highest estimates.

The first attempt to move the university of Nantes to Rennes takes place at the end of the 16th century. French king, Henry IV wants to punish Nantes, a ligueuse ville pour its support of the duke of Mercoeur. The university receives an order from the king by a letter of August 8, 1589 to move to Rennes, a city remains loyal to the monarchy. The institution is however not moved because of financial issue. A new letter of September 5, 1591 from the king reiterate the order of transfer, but again without application. On April 1598, a last king's letter stabilise the situation by confirming the establishment of the university in Nantes.

Academics

The LMD and ECTS systems 
Since 2004, the University has followed the LMD European system that divides the post-secondary education in 3 degrees: the Licence( equivalent of a Bachelor's degree), the Master and the Doctorat (PhD). Each course provides credits according to the European Credit Transfer System (ECTS) developed by the European Commission and a certain number of credits will allow a student to obtain their degree. For instance, the first post-secondary education degree, the Licence, can be obtained with 180 ECTS accumulated within 3 years. A full year gives 60 ECTS while a semester gives 30 ECTS.

List of faculties and schools 
 Faculty of Medicine
 Faculty of Pharmacy
 Faculty of Dentistry
 Faculty of Psychology
 Faculty of Science and Technology
 Faculty of Law and Political Science
 Department of History, Art History and Archaeology
 Department of Humanities and Languages
 Department of Languages - International Language Centre (CIL)
 Department of Sociology
 Department of Science and Technology of Physical Activities and Sports (STAPS)
 Institute of Geography and Regional Planning of Université de Nantes (IGARUN)
 Institute of Economics and Management - Institute of Business Administration (IEMN-IBE)
 Institute for Research and Education in French as a Foreign Language (IRFFLE)
 Institute of Teacher Training (ÉSPÉ)
 Institute of Preparation for General Administration (IPAG)
 Observatory of Earth and Planetary Sciences (OSUNA)
 Institute of Technology of Nantes
 Institute of Technology of La Roche-sur-Yon
 Institute of Technology of Saint-Nazaire
 School of Engineering - École Polytechnique de Nantes

Life on campus

Athletics

The University offers the students to practice more than 50 different sports, whether it is for competitive or recreational purposes. The University also provides adapted training to athlete students and participates in national and international competitions in the following disciplines: athletics, rowing, badminton, French boxing, soccer, ice hockey, judo, swimming, and sailing.
In 2011, the University was one of the first French universities to create a quidditch team.

Residence
Approximately 3,500 places on residence are available each year. These places are distributed by the CROUS on a social status basis taking into account the yearly income of the student's parents or legal representative, the number of siblings remaining under the parents' responsibility and the distance between the University and the student's place of residence.

There are two types of residences: 
 The traditional ones gather 9 m2 single bedrooms in a building with common bathrooms and kitchens at each floor.
 The renovated ones with individual furnished apartments going from 13 to 18m2.

Food locations
The CROUS from Nantes manages the different student restaurants on campus as well as the meals they offer. Most of the restaurants are open for lunch and dinner from Monday to Friday and offer a complete meal at a price regulated on a yearly basis. For the academic year of 2013-2014, the price of a meal was set at €3.30  (2019-2020).

In Nantes
 La Chantrerie
 La Lombarderie
 Le Grill CHANZY
 Le Restaurant Oniris Chantrerie 
 Le Restaurant Universitaire de la Fleuriaye
 Le Ricordeau 
 Le Rubis
 Le Tertre

In Saint-Nazaire
 Heinlex
 Gavy

In La Roche-sur-Yon
 La Courtaisière

International exchanges 
The University currently has partnerships with 397 institutions in 60 different countries worldwide. The majority of these partnerships are located in Europe. Each year, more than 1,000 students go abroad to study in one of those partner institutions for one or two semesters. The university receives each year students from its partner universities in exchange for welcoming the students from Nantes. The existing partnerships are ruled according to different international conventions such Erasmus (Europe), ISEP and CREPUQ (Quebec).

Exchange students are still registered in the University of Nantes and transfer the credits they gained in their host university. Conversely, the international students who came on exchange in Nantes will receive their credits in their home university.

There were 4,210 international students registered in the University of Nantes for the year 2018.

Notable faculty
 François Bonamy (1710-1786 in Nantes) - botanist and physician; regent to the medical faculty, procureur général, academic rector
 Gaston Bouatchidzé (1935, Georgia – 2022) - Georgian-French writer and translator.
 Pascal Salin (born 1939) - economist
 Denis Moreau (born 1967) - philosopher

Notable alumni 
 René Laennec (1781) - physician and musician; inventor of stethoscope
 Georges Clemenceau (1841-1929) - Prime Minister of France 1906-1909, 1917-1920
 Gabriel Guist'hau (1863,Saint-Pierre, Réunion -1931) - politician
 Jacqueline Auriol (1917, Challans, Vendée – 2000) - aviator who set several world speed records
 Annie Brisset - Professor of Translation Studies, Canada
 Jean-Marc Ayrault (born 1950) - Prime Minister of France 2012-2014
 Pierre Bordage (born 1955, La Réorthe, Vendée) - science fiction author
 François Bréda (1956, Romania – 2018) - Romanian essayist, poet, literary critique, literary historian, translator and theatrologist.
 Stéphane Le Foll (born 1960, Le Mans) - politician Socialist Party
 Azzedine Bousseksou (born 1964), Franco-Algerian physico-chemist
 Laurent Berger (born 1968 in Guérande, Loire-Atlantique) - trade unionist; general secretary of the French Democratic Confederation of Labour (CFDT) 
 Sylvie Tellier (born 1978) - television personality, businesswoman, and beauty pageant titleholder who was crowned Miss France 2002
 Yvonne Okoro (born 1984, Nigeria) - Ghanaian-Nigerian actress
 Clément Nyaletsossi Voule (born in Togo) - diplomat and jurist.
 Jean-Marc Coicaud - legal and political theorist

See also 
 List of medieval universities

References

External links 

 

 
University
1460 establishments in Europe
1460s establishments in France
Saint-Nazaire
Educational institutions established in the 15th century
Educational institutions established in 1970
Buildings and structures in Nantes
Education in Pays de la Loire
Tourist attractions in Nantes